Salah ol Din Mahalleh (also Romanized as Şalāḩ ol Dīn Maḩalleh , Şalāḩ ed Dīn Maḩalleh, and Şalāḩ od Dīn Maḩalleh) is a village in Rudpey-ye Jonubi Rural District, in the Central District of Sari County, Mazandaran Province, Iran. At the 2006 census, its population was 437, in 116 families.

References 

Populated places in Sari County